Babylon Hill in Dorset is a 2.2 hectare geological Site of Special Scientific Interest designated in 1977.

It was also the site of a minor skirmish, the Battle of Babylon Hill, during the English Civil War, which resulted in the Earl of Bedford's Roundheads forcing back Sir Ralph Hopton's Cavaliers to Sherborne.

References

Sites of Special Scientific Interest in Dorset
Sites of Special Scientific Interest notified in 1977